Multimedia Records (stylized as  MULTIMEDIArecords) is a Serbian music label based in Belgrade.

History
Multimedia Records was founded in February 2002 by Marko Gasperlin, Rodoljub Stojanović and Jadranka Janković-Nešić. During first eight years, company was represented by Universal Music Group as their licensed partner.

Multimedia Records developed a brand of Universal Music in Serbia, distributing their releases. Serbian shows of Universal Music Group artists such as 50 Cent, Rihanna, Mark Knopfler, Kaiser Chiefs, Bryan Adams, Metallica, Busta Rhymes and The Police were hosted by Multimedia Records.

In 2003, Multimedia Records became a member of International Federation of the Phonographic Industry.

Multimedia Records have license to distribute releases from various regional record companies in Serbia. Some of those record companies are Aquarius Records, Croatia Records, Hit Records (Croatia) and Menart Records (Slovenia).

Through partnership agreement with Menart Records from 2008., Multimedia Records obtained rights to distribute Sony BMG releases in Serbia.

Artists 
Some of the artist currently signed to Multimedia Records, or have been so in the past, include:
Ajs Nigrutin
Atheist Rap
Block Out
Cubismo
Dejan Cukić
Doktor Spira i Ljudska Bića
Dža ili Bu
Emina Jahović
Goblini
Marčelo
Srđan Marjanović
Night Shift
Pero Defformero
Prljavi Inspektor Blaža i Kljunovi
Rare
Six Pack
Slobodan Trkulja
Sunshine
Wikluh Sky

See also 
 List of record labels

External links 
 Official website

References

 Multimedia Records at Discogs

Serbian record labels
Record labels established in 2002
Rock record labels
Serbian rock music
2002 establishments in Serbia